The 1928 George Washington Colonials football team was an American football team that represented George Washington University as an independent during the 1928 college football season. In their fifth season under head coach Harry W. Crum, the team compiled a 1–7 record.

Schedule

References

George Washington
George Washington Colonials football seasons
George Washington Colonials football